"Magnetic Love" is a song by Argentinian singer Virginia da Cunha taken from her first solo studio album, TBA (2017). It was written and produced by Sebastian Bazan, and released as the first official single on 22 May 2017. "Magnetic Love" is an electro-pop.

The track received a good reception by her fans reaching the #24 of the General iTunes Charts in Argentina being the best solo debut of a Bandana member like indie artist.

Chart performance
Hours after its official release on the iTunes Store in Argentina, "Magnetic Love" reached the #11 position of the Argentinian Pop store's chart and the #24 in the General iTunes Chart.

References

2017 singles
Electropop songs
2017 songs